José Mena Rodríguez (born 15 May 1998), commonly known as Pepe Mena, is a Spanish footballer who plays for Czech club FC Baník Ostrava as an attacking midfielder.

Club career
Born in Utrera, Seville, Andalusia, Mena finished his formation with Sevilla FC. On 20 March 2017, he renewed his contract until 2019.

On 14 May 2017, without even appearing for the reserves, Mena was an unused substitute for the main squad in a 1–4 La Liga away loss against Real Madrid. Ahead of the 2017–18 season, he was promoted to the B-side in Segunda División.

Mena made his professional debut on 19 August 2017, coming on as a late substitute for Yan Brice in a 1–1 away draw against CA Osasuna. He scored his first goal the following 25 March, netting the game's only in an away defeat of Real Zaragoza.

Mena made his first-team debut on 1 November 2018, replacing fellow youth graduate Borja Lasso in a 0–0 away draw against CF Villanovense, for the season's Copa del Rey. On 28 November of the following year, he made his European debut by coming on for Óliver Torres in the 68th minute of a 2–0 home win against Qarabağ FK, for the 2019–20 UEFA Europa League.

On 5 October 2020, Mena moved abroad after agreeing to a contract with Czech First League side FC Baník Ostrava.

Career statistics

Honours

Club
Sevilla
UEFA Europa League: 2019–20

References

External links

1998 births
Living people
People from Utrera
Sportspeople from the Province of Seville
Spanish footballers
Footballers from Andalusia
Association football midfielders
Segunda División players
Sevilla Atlético players
Sevilla FC players
FC Baník Ostrava players
Spanish expatriate footballers
Spanish expatriate sportspeople in the Czech Republic
Expatriate footballers in the Czech Republic